Sarchil  or Sar Chil may refer to:
 Sarchil, Hormozgan
 Sar Chil, Kerman